Although the Stonewall riots on June 28, 1969, are generally considered the impetus of the modern gay liberation movement, a number of demonstrations of civil resistance took place prior to that date. These actions, often organized by local homophile organizations but sometimes spontaneous, addressed concerns ranging from anti-gay discrimination in employment and public accommodations to the exclusion of homosexuals from the United States military to police harassment to the treatment of homosexuals in revolutionary Cuba. The early actions have been credited with preparing the gay community for Stonewall and contributing to the riots' symbolic power.

A common technique of early activists was the picket line, especially for those actions organized by such Eastern groups as the Mattachine Society of New York, the Mattachine Society of Washington, Philadelphia's Janus Society, and the New York chapter of Daughters of Bilitis; these groups acted under the collective name East Coast Homophile Organizations (ECHO). Organized pickets tended to be in large urban population centers because these centers were where the largest concentration of homophile activists were located. Picketers at ECHO-organized events were required to follow strict dress codes: men wore ties, preferably with a jacket, and women wore skirts. Because a common focus of was employment discrimination, Mattachine Society of Washington founder Frank Kameny wanted to portray homosexuals as "presentable and 'employable'". Many of the participants in these early actions went on to become deeply involved in the gay liberation movement.

Actions

See also
 List of LGBT rights organizations
 Timeline of LGBT history

Notes

References
 Allyn, David (2000). Make Love, Not War: The Sexual Revolution, an Unfettered History. Little, Brown and Company. .
 Alwood, Edward (1996). Straight News: Gays, Lesbians, and the News Media. Columbia University Press. .
 Bérubé, Allan (1990). Coming Out Under Fire: The History of Gay Men and Women in World War Two. New York, The Penguin Group. .
 Bianco, David (1999). Gay Essentials: Facts For Your Queer Brain. Los Angeles, Alyson Books. .
 Campbell, J. Louis (2007). Jack Nichols, Gay Pioneer: "Have You Heard My Message?". Haworth Press. .
 Carter, David (2005). Stonewall: The Riots That Sparked the Gay Revolution. Macmillan. .
 Cleninden, Dudley and Adam Nagourney (1999). Out For Good: The Struggle to Build a Gay Rights Movement in America. New York, Simon & Schuster. .
 D'Emilio, John (1983). Sexual Politics, Sexual Communities: The Making of a Homosexual Minority in the United States, 1940–1970. Chicago: The University of Chicago Press. .
 Duberman, Martin (1993). Stonewall. Penguin Books. .
 Eisenbach, David (2006). Gay Power: An American Revolution. Carroll & Graf Publishers. .
 Faderman, Lillian and Stuart Timmons (2006). Gay L.A.: A History of Sexual Outlaws, Power Politics, and Lipstick Lesbians. Basic Books. .
 Fletcher, Lynne Yamaguchi (1992). The First Gay Pope and Other Records. Boston, Alyson Publications. .
 Gallo, Marcia M. (2006). Different Daughters: A History of the Daughters of Bilitis and the Rise of the Lesbian Rights Movement. Carroll & Graf Publishers. .
 Hogan, Steve and Lee Hudson (1998). Completely Queer: The Gay and Lesbian Encyclopedia. New York, Henry Holt and Company. .
 Loughery, John (1998). The Other Side of Silence – Men's Lives and Gay Identities: A Twentieth-Century History. New York, Henry Holt and Company. .
 Marks Ridinger, Robert B. (2004). Speaking For Our Lives: Historic Speeches and Rhetoric for Gay and Lesbian Rights (1892-2000). Haworth Press. .
 Miller, Neil (1995). Out of the Past: Gay and Lesbian History from 1869 to the Present. New York, Vintage Books. .
 Murray, Stephen O. (1996). American Gay. Chicago, University of Chicago Press. .
 Stryker, Susan and Jim Van Buskirk, with foreword by Armisted Maupin (1996). Gay by the Bay: A History of Queer Culture in the San Francisco Bay Area. San Francisco, Chronicle Press. .
 Teal, Donn (1971, reissued 1995). The Gay Militants: How Gay Liberation Began in America, 1969–1971. New York, St. Martin's Press.  (1995 edition).
 Timmons, Stuart (1990). The Trouble With Harry Hay. Boston, Alyson Publications. .
 Tobin, Kay and Randy Wicker (1972). The Gay Crusaders. New York, Paperback Library, a division of Coronet Communications. .
 Witt, Lynn, Sherry Thomas and Eric Marcus (eds.) (1995). Out in All Directions: The Almanac of Gay and Lesbian America. New York, Warner Books. .

External links
Resources on Regional Homophile/LGBT Organizations in the 1960s
Political correspondence from the papers of Frank Kameny

Actions in the United States prior to the Stonewall riots
LGBT actions prior to the Stonewall riots
Actions in the United Stations prior to the Stonewall riots
LGBT actions prior to the Stonewall riots
LGBT actions in the United States prior to the Stonewall riots
Actions prior to the Stonewall riots
 United States prior to the Stone wall riots
Actions in the United Stations prior to the Stonewall riots
LGBT actions prior to the Stonewall riots